The Hangzhou Xiaoshan Sports Centre Stadium (Simplified Chinese: 杭州萧山体育中心) is a football stadium in Xiaoshan, Hangzhou, China. This stadium completed on October 11, 1998. It holds 10,118 people after the renovation works finished in 2022. The stadium is the home of Hangzhou Sanchao.

External links 
Official Site

Football venues in Hangzhou
Xiaoshan District
Sports venues completed in 1998
1998 establishments in China